Brian Hardin is a member of the Nebraska Legislature for District 48 from Gering, Nebraska. He was elected to the Nebraska Legislature on November 8, 2022. Hardin serves as the CEO of ARG Advisors Ltd.

Electoral history

References 

Republican Party Nebraska state senators
21st-century American politicians
Living people
Year of birth missing (living people)
Chadron State College alumni